The 1986 Allan Cup was the Canadian senior ice hockey championship for the 1985–86 senior "AAA" season.  The event was hosted by the Nelson Maple Leafs in Nelson, British Columbia.  The 1986 playoff marked the 78th time that the Allan Cup has been awarded.

Teams
Corner Brook Royals (Eastern Canadian Champions)
Nelson Maple Leafs (Western Canadian Champions)

Best-of-Seven Series
Corner Brook Royals 6 - Nelson Maple Leafs 4
Corner Brook Royals 6 - Nelson Maple Leafs 5
Corner Brook Royals 5 - Nelson Maple Leafs 2
Corner Brook Royals 7 - Nelson Maple Leafs 0

External links
Allan Cup archives 
Allan Cup website

Allan Cup